[[File:Amarna Akkadian letter.png|thumb|right|Amarna letter EA 161, Aziru to Pharaoh, "An Absence Explained." (British Museum no. 29818, painted in black on top of letter, visible)<ref>Moran, 1970, The Amarna Letters, EA 161, "An absence explained, pp. 247-248.</ref> ]]

Aziru was the Canaanite ruler of Amurru, modern Lebanon, in the 14th century BC. He was the son of Abdi-Ashirta, the previous Egyptian vassal of Amurru and a direct contemporary of Akhenaten.

The dealings of Aziru are well-known from the Amarna letters. While being a formal vassal of Egypt, he tried to expand his kingdom towards the Mediterranean coast and captured the city of Sumur (Simyrra). This was seen with alarm by his neighbouring states, particularly Rib-Hadda, the king of Gubla, (Byblos), who pleaded for Egyptian troops to be sent for their protection. Rib-Hadda was ultimately exiled—and probably not long afterwards killed—at the behest of Aziru. Rib-Hadda had left his city of Byblos for four months to conclude a treaty with the king of Beirut, Ammunira, but when he returned home, he learned that a palace coup led by his brother Ilirabih had unseated him from power. He temporarily sought refuge with Ammunira and unsuccessfully appealed for support from Egypt to restore him to the throne. (EA 136-138; EA 141 & EA 142) When this failed, Rib-Hadda was forced to ignominiously appeal to his sworn enemy, Aziru, to place him back on the throne of his city. Aziru promptly betrayed him and dispatched Rib-Hadda into the hands of the rulers of Sidon where Rib-Hadda almost certainly met his death. 

This event is mentioned in Amarna letter EA 162 by Akhenaten to Aziru when the pharaoh demanded that Aziru travel to Egypt to explain his actions. Aziru was detained in Egypt for at least a year before being released when the advancing Hittites conquered the important city of Amki thereby threatening Amurru (EA 170). Aziru was allowed to leave Egypt and return to his kingdom. Aziru had, however, made secret contacts with the Hittite king Suppiluliuma I, and sometime upon his return to Amurru, he permanently switched his allegiance to the Hittites to whom he remained loyal until his death. Henceforth, Amurru remained firmly in Hittite hands until the reign of the 19th Dynasty Pharaohs Seti I and Ramesses II.

See also
Amarna letter EA 161

References

Moran, William L. The Amarna Letters.'' Johns Hopkins University Press, 1987, 1992. (softcover)

Amarna letters writers
Canaanite people
14th-century BC rulers
14th-century BC people